Dyssodia papposa is a species of annual herbaceous forb in the genus Dyssodia, commonly known as fetid marigold or prairie dogweed. It is native to North America and parts of the Southwest, extending into the Northeast. The plant has been used by Native Americans to treat multiple medical conditions.

Description
Fetid marigold is a erect multi-branching annual with a large taproot, common to anthropogenically disturbed areas such as roadsides, fields, and meadows, at elevations from 3000–6500 ft (914–1981 m). Its height is 4–16 inches (5–70 cm). The leaves are simple and opposite, 3/4 in to 2 in (15–50 mm) long and linearly lobate.

The flowers have the disk and ray structure characteristic of the Asteraceae family; both are yellow-orange, up to 1/2in long with 5–8 ray flowers which are up to 3.5cm long and 1.5 cm wide, with tubular disk flowers and greenish outer and inner bracts. Seeds are small, hairy, narrowly conical with a tuft of bristle at the top, dark brown in color when mature. Distinctive orange odor glands dot the stalk, leaves and stems of the plant, which are the source of its characteristic scent.
It flowers in summer to fall. The name dyssodia is from the Greek δυσοδια (dusodia), meaning "bad odor", while papposa is from the Latin meaning "with pappus".

Its native range includes the central plains of North America and parts of the Southwest, extending into the Northeast. It has recently been documented in Canada, where it is expected to expand its range via adventitious growth.

Ecology
The plant is host to the dainty sulphur butterfly. It is commonly found in prairie dog towns and is among their preferred food sources.

Ethnobotany
Fetid marigold was given to horses for coughs by the Dakota, used as a febrifuge and smoked for epilepsy by the Keres, applied to red ant bites by the Navajo, and was used by the Lakota as a treatment for headaches, internal bleeding and breathing difficulties. The Omaha reportedly used it to induce nosebleeds to cure headache.
Seeds were ground into flour for bread or roasted without grinding and combined with other foods by the Apache, who also ate the tops of the plant as greens.

References

Tageteae
Flora of North America
Taxa named by Étienne Pierre Ventenat